Emanuel Zervakis (January 23, 1930 – June 25, 2003) was a NASCAR driver and team owner. He won two NASCAR Grand National Series races in his career, both in 1961 (Greenville 200 and Yankee 500). He later went on to own a part-time Cup team and a successful Busch Series team, receiving five Busch wins as an owner, four with Butch Lindley and one with Ricky Rudd.

Career

Driver
He started in 83 NASCAR Cup races between 1956 and 1963 and finished in the top ten in points twice. He started his first race at Daytona Beach in 1956, finishing last in a field of 76 cars. He did not score a single top ten finish until 1960, but after that, he was in the top ten more than he was out. Zervakis was disqualified for his fuel tank being too large after winning at Wilson Speedway in 1960. He was the last winning driver to be disqualified from a race for 62 years. In 1961, he finished third in the point standings, only behind Ned Jarrett and Rex White.  He ran his last race in 1963.  He also made 6 starts in the now-defunct Convertible Series.

Owner
Zervakis was also a team owner. He might be remembered most for fielding a car for Dale Jarrett's first Winston Cup race. his Cup team competed in 39 events total, with a best finish was a second-place finish by Butch Lindley at Martinsville. He also had five wins in the Nationwide series, including Ricky Rudd's only Busch/Nationwide win in his first start, and four wins by Butch Lindley in 1982, where he finished ninth in points despite running a partial schedule.

Racing career results

NASCAR Grand National Series

NASCAR Convertible Series

References

External links
 
 

NASCAR drivers
NASCAR team owners
1930 births
2003 deaths
Racing drivers from Virginia